Vesna Bajkuša (born 21 May 1970 in Sarajevo) is a Bosnian basketball coach and  former basketball player. She played as a defender won a silver medal playing for the Yugoslavian women's basketball team at the 1988 Seoul Olympics.

She later represented Bosnia and Herzegovina at the 1993 Mediterranean games, and won a gold.

References

1970 births
Living people
Basketball players from Sarajevo
Bosnia and Herzegovina women's basketball players
Yugoslav women's basketball players
Shooting guards
Bosnia and Herzegovina women's basketball coaches
Basketball players at the 1988 Summer Olympics
Olympic basketball players of Yugoslavia
Olympic medalists in basketball
Olympic silver medalists for Yugoslavia
ŽKK Željezničar Sarajevo players
Female sports coaches
Mediterranean Games gold medalists for Bosnia and Herzegovina
Mediterranean Games medalists in basketball
Competitors at the 1993 Mediterranean Games
Medalists at the 1988 Summer Olympics